Cheshmeh Gush Latif (also Romanized as Cheshmeh Gūsh Laṭīf; also known as Cheshmeh Gūsh and Cheshmeh Gosh) is a village in Miyankuh-e Gharbi Rural District, in the Central District of Pol-e Dokhtar County, Lorestan Province, Iran. At the 2006 census, its population was 60, in 11 families.

References 

Towns and villages in Pol-e Dokhtar County